Curtognathus is an extinct genus of conodonts from the Ordovician in the family Distacodontidae.

References

External links 

 
 Curtognathus at fossilworks.org (retrieved 4 May 2016)

Conodont genera
Ordovician conodonts
Distacodontidae